Robin Haase was the defending champion but decided not to participate.
João Sousa defeated Jan-Lennard Struff 6–2, 0–6, 6–2 in the final to claim his first Challenger title.

Seeds

Draw

Finals

Top half

Bottom half

References
 Main Draw
 Qualifying Draw

Franken Challenge - Singles
2011 Singles